During the 1899–1900 English football season, Brentford competed in the Southern League Second Division. A Middlesex FA investigation into the club's financial affairs necessitated a change to professional status mid-season, but a forgettable campaign ended with the Bees finishing third-from-bottom.

Season summary 

After a difficult first season in the Southern League Second Division, Brentford's AGM in May 1899 revealed that the club had lost £100 on the previous season, taking the overall debt to £180 (equivalent to £ in ). After a series of meetings, a new committee was elected in July after it was decided that the club would continue to operate on an amateur basis. On the playing side, only six members of the team that finished the previous season remained at the club – goalkeeper Ben Brown, full back George Turner, half backs 'Nick' Mattocks, Billy Smith and forwards Richard Dailley, Thomas Knapman and Charlie Evans. Incoming transfers included full back Bert Lane, half back G. Pearce and forwards E. Andrews and John Bayne.

Brentford won and drew each of the opening two Second Division fixtures, with new forward John Bayne scoring in each, before he and George Turner, both soldiers, departed for service in the Second Boer War with their regiments. Things went from bad to worse in October when the Middlesex FA opened an enquiry into Brentford's "shamateurism", the results of which saw the club fined £10 and suspended from football for a month beginning 20 November. Additionally, a number of members of the club's committee were suspended sine die or until 30 April 1900. A new committee took charge of the club and elected to turn professional.

Following the resumption of competitive play on 23 December, Brentford showed appalling form, failing to win until late March 1900. A 13-match winless streak, which stretched back to 23 September, culminated in a 7–0 thrashing at the hands of Grays United on 24 March. Additionally, a meeting had been called in January to discuss if the club could even continue, but donations of £60 (equivalent to £ in ) helped to ensure that the Bees would survive for the immediate future. Late in the season, professional half backs Frederick Broughton and Ralph McElhaney joined the club and immediately fortunes turned around on the pitch, with Brentford winning four and drawing one of the final six matches of the season to finish in 9th position, two places off the bottom.

League table

Results
Brentford's goal tally listed first.

Legend

Southern League Second Division

FA Cup

 Source: 100 Years of Brentford

Playing squad

Left club during season

 "Bailey" is an alias
 Source: 100 Years of Brentford

Statistics

Appearances

Goalscorers 

Players listed in italics left the club mid-season.
Source: 100 Years Of Brentford

Management

Summary

References 

Brentford F.C. seasons
Brentford